Police & Thief (also spelled as Police and Thief) was a Singaporean sitcom that aired on MediaCorp Channel 5 from 2004 to 2010.

Synopsis
Sgt Dollah Abu Bakar is a single-father and police officer whose neighbour Lee Tok Kong is a former gangster. The two constantly bicker but they also help each other's families out on a couple of occassions. Besides, the both of them have been living together side by side for many years and could also be good friends towards each other if they don't quarrel, just like their children whom are also good friends as well. When Sgt Dollah remarries Haslindah in Season 4, she also became good friends with Tok Kong's wife named Lily Lee as well. This suggests that both family neighbours could really get along well when there isn't any misunderstandings. The sitcom had its 6th and final season aired in March 2010.

Cast
Suhaimi Yusof as Sgt Dollah Abu Bakar 
Mark Lee as Lee Tok Kong
Margaret Lee (Seasons 1–5) as Mrs Lily Lee
Sharon Wong (Season 6)
Glenn Wong as Lee Xiao Long
Ang Ching Hui as Lee Xiao Yun
Era Farida as Haslindah
Mohd Hafiz as Rudy
Noriff Danial Ashriq as Rafi

External links

-Season 1 Episode guide
-Season 2 Episode guide
-Season 3 Episode guide
-Season 4 Episode guide
-Season 5 Episode guide
-Season 6 Episode guide
xinmsn

2004 Singaporean television series debuts
2010 Singaporean television series endings
2000s sitcoms
2010s sitcoms
2000s police comedy television series
2010s police comedy television series
Singaporean television sitcoms
Channel 5 (Singapore) original programming